This list of tallest buildings in Long Beach, California ranks skyscrapers in Long Beach, California, by height.

Tallest buildings

See also

 List of tallest buildings in Los Angeles
 List of tallest buildings in San Diego

References

Lists of tallest buildings in California
Long Beach